The pink-bellied imperial pigeon (Ducula poliocephala), also known as the zone-tailed pigeon, is found in the Philippines. It is a large fruit-eating bird reaching sizes of up to 42cm long.

The pink-bellied imperial pigeon is mostly dark green, with a pale gray head, an appropriately pink belly, and a brown, black, and gray pattern on its tail. Its eyes and eye ceres are red. These birds have been observed in mixed roosts with other large doves.

Description

Ebird describes this as "A large pigeon of foothill and lower montane forest canopy with a white head, a dark bluish-gray chest and upper back, green wings, a whitish belly with a pink tinge, and rufous under the base of the tail. Note the large red eye-ring. Somewhat similar to Mindoro imperial pigeon, but the pink-bellied has a dark neck and chest. Song is a deep, booming, upslurred “doo-dup! doo-dup!”which can be heard from a distance." It is believed that these birds are strong fliers and are capable of flying inter island.

Habitat and Conservation Status
Its natural habitat is tropical moist lowland forest and montane forest up to 1,500 m. According to the IUCN Red List and BirdLife International's Red Book, the pink-bellied imperial pigeon is classified as Near-threatened. However, the Philippine Red List classifies this bird as Critically Endangered. This is due to the loss of habitat, trapping for the pet trade and hunting for food.  Although it occurs quite widely within the Philippines, this species is scarce and probably has a moderately small population, which is suspected to be in moderately rapid decline owing to hunting and the removal of its favoured lowland forest habitat.  This bird is extremely rare in Luzon but frequently more commonly observed in Negros Island, Mindoro, Samar and Mindanao. It is locally extinct on Cebu.

References

pink-bellied imperial pigeon
Endemic birds of the Philippines
pink-bellied imperial pigeon
pink-bellied imperial pigeon